Walter Lenox (August 17, 1817 – July 16, 1874) was Mayor of Washington, D.C. from 1850 to 1852. He was the only Mayor of Washington City born within Washington City and one of only two born in the District of Columbia.

Early life 
Lenox was born in the City of Washington on August 17, 1817, the son of Captain Peter Lenox and Margaret Wilkerson Lenox. He was the first mayor to be born in the city of Washington, graduating from Yale University in 1837 and returning to the capital to practice law in the early 1840s. During at last part of that period, he lived with future Washington mayor Richard Wallach.

Political career 
Lenox served on the Washington city council (the lower of its two legislative chambers) from 1842 to 1843, then as an Alderman from 1843 to 1849, serving his last term as President of the Board of Aldermen. Thus when mayor William Winston Seaton declined to run for a sixth term in 1850, Lenox was the heir apparent — although because of his young age (only 33), he was dismissed by many residents of the city, particularly when the popular former mayor Roger C. Weightman announced his intention to seek the office again. Ultimately, Lenox won the election by 32 votes.

Lenox's term as mayor was of little note; his most prominent accomplishments were his presiding at the laying of the cornerstone of the extension to the U.S. Capitol, service on the Washington Monument Association, and proclamation of an official day of mourning for the deceased President Zachary Taylor. The records of the Columbia Historical Society also note that he was "deeply concerned with the education of the youth. He gave greater attention to the public school question than any other."

Lenox was a Whig, which became a liability in the mayoral election of 1852 (the year in which the Whig Party collapsed). His Democratic opponent, John Walker Maury, defeated Lenox by almost 900 votes.

Later life 
After his mayoralty, Lenox married but became a widower after only eighteen months. He married Rachel Ludlow (the sister of NY Speaker of the Legislative Assembly William H. Ludlow) in January, 1855. She and their first-born child died July 1856.

Lenox sympathized with and supported the Confederacy. In June 1861, after the occupation of Alexandria by Union forces during the Civil War, he moved to Richmond where he organized other "refugees" from DC, Maryland and Delaware. Upon returning to Washington in October 1863 to settle the estate of a deceased relative, he spoke openly in contempt of the Union and was arrested and imprisoned by his old friend, General Winfield Scott. He spent the next 20 months in the prison at Fort McHenry and was released in October 1865, half a year after the war ended. Lenox's health suffered after prison, and he died in 1874 at the age of 57. He was interred at Rock Creek Cemetery in Washington.

Legacy
In 1887, the Walter Lenox School at 5th and G SE opened and was named in his honor. It closed in 1931 and the building served various non-profit organizations until the late 1990s when it was sold for development. In 2006 it opened as condominiums.

References

External links
 

1817 births
1874 deaths
Mayors of Washington, D.C.
Confederate States Army personnel
American Civil War prisoners of war
Burials at Rock Creek Cemetery
Yale University alumni
19th-century American politicians